Israel (Isserl) ben Josef (around 1500 – 1568) was a wealthy Jewish merchant, banker, and Talmudist who settled in Kraków in 1519, following the expulsion of the Jews from the German city of Regensburg. He was the father of Moses Isserles and the founder of the Remah Synagogue in Kazimierz, now a district of Kraków, built in 1553 on land owned by Israel ben Josef.

According to The Jewish Encyclopedia, it may be concluded from the terms which his son applies to him in his preface to "Meḥir Yayin" that he was the chief of the community.

Remah Synagogue 

According to one popular tradition, Israel founded the synagogue in honor of his son Moses, who already in his youth was famed for his erudition. However, the Hebrew inscription of the foundation tablet reads: "Husband, R. Israel, son of Josef of blessed memory, bound in strength, to the glory of the Eternal One, and of his wife Malka, daughter of Eleazar, let her soul be received among the living, built this synagogue, the house of the Lord, from her bequest. Lord restore the treasure of Israel", implying that the synagogue was built in memory of Israel's wife, Malka (died 1552).

Legend 

Israel was careful to never engage in business on Fridays after midday. According to legend, it was in this merit that he was awarded from Heaven to have such an illustrious son.

References 

Year of birth unknown
1568 deaths
Bankers
16th-century merchants
16th-century Jews
Talmudists
Jews from Galicia (Eastern Europe)
Businesspeople from Kraków
Year of birth uncertain